Joseph Albert Pierre Paul Pilote (December 11, 1931 – September 9, 2017) was a Canadian professional ice hockey defenceman and perennial All-Star, most notably for the Chicago Black Hawks of the National Hockey League (NHL), for which he served as team captain for seven seasons. He won the James Norris Memorial Trophy three times for best defenceman in the NHL.

Early life
Born in Kenogami, Quebec, Pilote's family moved to Fort Erie, Ontario, when he was 14 years old. Because the local rink collapsed in a storm, Pilote did not play his first organized hockey game until he was 17. He tried out with a Niagara Falls junior B team as a centre, but was turned down because the club needed a defenceman instead. Pilote practiced as a defenceman and joined the team the following season.

Rudy Pilous recruited Pilote to the St. Catharines Teepees of the Ontario Hockey Association (OHA); he made the team out of training camp in 1950. Pilote played four full seasons for the minor professional club the Buffalo Bisons of the American Hockey League (AHL). During his fifth season, he was signed by the Chicago Black Hawks of the National Hockey League (NHL), starting his professional career.

NHL defenceman
Pilote became a preeminent star for the Black Hawks, winning the James Norris Memorial Trophy as the NHL's most outstanding defenceman three straight seasons in 1963, 1964 and 1965 — a feat matched or surpassed only by Doug Harvey, Bobby Orr and Nicklas Lidström in NHL history — as well as runner-up in 1962, 1966 and 1967. He was on the First or second All-Star team every year from 1960 to 1967. Pilote had an iron man streak of playing 376 consecutive games over more than five seasons. He was often paired with Elmer "Moose" Vasko on the Chicago blue line.

In 1961, the Black Hawks won the Stanley Cup. During the off-season, team captain Ed Litzenberger was traded and Pilote was named the new captain. He held this role with the team until traded to the Toronto Maple Leafs in 1968 for forward Jim Pappin; his seven-season tenure as captain was, until surpassed by current team captain Jonathan Toews in the 2016–17 NHL season, the longest in franchise history.

Pilote was traded to the Toronto Maple Leafs on May 23, 1968 for Jim Pappin and played one season with the team before retiring. He played his last game on April 6, 1969, finishing his career with 80 goals and 418 assists in 890 games.

Post-NHL career
At the time of his retirement, Pilote was the second leading defence scorer in NHL history (behind Harvey), as well as the sixth leading career scorer for the Black Hawks and second in all-time assists behind Stan Mikita. He remains eighth in all-time assists for the Hawks.

Pilote was inducted in the Hockey Hall of Fame in 1975. In 1997, he was ranked number 59 on The Hockey News list of the 100 greatest hockey players.

On July 18, 2008, the Blackhawks announced that the #3 jersey worn by Pilote and Keith Magnuson would be retired in a joint ceremony, the sixth number so honoured by the club. The ceremony was held on November 12, 2008, before the Blackhawks' game against the Boston Bruins at the United Center. In January 2012, Pilote was honoured with a bronze statue in front of the Jonquière Sports Palace. In the fall of 2013, ECW Press published his biography Heart of the Blackhawks: The Pierre Pilote Story, co-written with L. "Waxy" Gregoire and David M. Dupuis. Pilote died of cancer on September 9, 2017.

Career statistics

* Stanley Cup Champion.Sources:'

Awards and honours

References

External links

1931 births
2017 deaths
French Quebecers
Buffalo Bisons (AHL) players
Canadian ice hockey defencemen
Chicago Blackhawks captains
Chicago Blackhawks players
Deaths from cancer in Ontario
Hockey Hall of Fame inductees
Ice hockey people from Quebec
James Norris Memorial Trophy winners
National Hockey League All-Stars
National Hockey League players with retired numbers
St. Catharines Teepees players
Sportspeople from Saguenay, Quebec
Stanley Cup champions
Toronto Maple Leafs players